A football or Gaelic ball is the spherical leather football used in the sports of Gaelic football and ladies' Gaelic football and international rules football.

The pattern of panels consists of six groups perpendicular to each other, each group being composed of two trapezoidal panels and one rectangular panel; 18 panels in all.

Rules

Gaelic football
Smaller balls can be used in under-15 or younger grades. In addition, balls are approved by Central Council "on the basis of compliance with standards and tests set out by Central Council […] Footballs shall fully comply with the Playing Gear and Equipment regulations as ratified from time to time by Central Council." Footballs are pumped to 9.75–10 psi (67–69 kPa).

Ladies' Gaelic football
In ladies' Gaelic football, a size 4 football is used in all grades of competition from under-12 upwards. A size 3 or Go Games football is used in younger age groups.

History

Early rules did not precisely define the football, and the ball used was the same as that used in association football (soccer).

The first distinctive Gaelic footballs were offered for sale in Dublin in 1886. Leather balls quickly became soggy and misshapen until water-resistant coatings were added.

See also
 Sliotar
 Football (ball)

References

Gaelic
Gaelic football equipment
Inflatable manufactured goods